98 Herculis is a single star located approximately 590 light years from the Sun in the northern constellation Hercules. It is visible to the naked eye as a dim, red-hued point of light with an apparent visual magnitude of 4.96. The brightness of the star is diminished by an extinction of 0.19 due to interstellar dust. The star is moving closer to the Earth with a heliocentric radial velocity of −19 km/s.

This is an aging red giant star on the asymptotic giant branch with a stellar classification of M3-SIII, where the suffix notation indicating this is an S-type star. It is a mild barium star with an intensity class of 0.2, and is a suspected variable star, although Percy and Shepherd (1992) were unable to confirm this. With the hydrogen at its core exhausted, the star has expanded to around 85 times the Sun's radius. It is radiating 1,330 times the luminosity of the Sun from its swollen photosphere at an effective temperature of 3,772 K.

References

M-type giants
S-type stars
Suspected variables
Barium stars
Hercules (constellation)
Durchmusterung objects
Herculis, 098
165625
088657
6765